Anokhinskoye is a rural locality (a village) in Opokskoye Rural Settlement, Velikoustyugsky District, Vologda Oblast, Russia. The population was 8 as of 2002.

Geography 
Anokhinskoye is located 54 km southwest of Veliky Ustyug (the district's administrative centre) by road. Nizhneye Anisimovo is the nearest rural locality.

References 

Rural localities in Velikoustyugsky District